Twisted Nerve is a 1968 British psychological thriller film directed by Roy Boulting and starring Hywel Bennett, Hayley Mills, Billie Whitelaw and Frank Finlay. The film follows a disturbed young man, Martin, who pretends, under the name of Georgie, to be intellectually impaired in order to be near Susan—a girl with whom he has become infatuated. Martin kills those who get in his way.

Plot
Martin plays catch with his older brother Pete, who has severe learning difficulties and has been sent to live in a special boarding school in London, by their mother. Martin is the only remaining figure in Pete's family life; their father died years ago and their mother has a new life with her new husband, a wealthy banker. Martin expresses concern for his brother's well-being to the school's physician, who is comfortable with Pete's situation, though he makes it clear that Pete cannot be expected to live much longer.

After the title sequence, Martin is shown in a toy store, gazing at Susan, who purchases a toy. As she leaves, Martin follows after having pocketed a toy duck. Two store detectives ask them to return to the manager's office. The detectives assert that Martin and Susan were working together to allow Martin to steal a toy. Susan assures them she has never met Martin.

When questioned by the manager, Martin presents himself as mentally challenged, and calls himself "Georgie". Apparently now disbelieving in a link between them, the manager asks Susan for her address, and Martin appears to make a mental note when she offers it. Sympathetic to him, Susan pays for the toy. Implying that this was a misunderstanding, the manager lets them leave.

Martin returns home and finds his parents arguing in the parlor, over his lack of interest in life. Despite the apparent course of events in the toy shop, they have come to hear of the duck. There is allusion to some perverse behaviour he has exhibited, though this is not elaborated upon. In his room, now behaving as "Georgie", he rocks in a rocking chair while smiling meekly in the mirror and caressing a stuffed animal. The camera pans down to reveal that the rocking motion of the chair is smashing a photo of his stepfather.

The next day, Martin goes to Susan's house and waits for her to return. She arrives with a young Indian man named Shashee. He drops off Susan, who thanks him; she goes to the library, where she keeps an after-school job. Martin approaches Susan who immediately recognises him as Georgie. He tells her that he followed her, and pays her back for the toy. Before he leaves, Martin, as Georgie, gets Susan to lend him The Jungle Book.

Martin has a heated conversation with his stepfather, who insists he travel to Australia. Martin refuses and returns to his room. Martin stares in the mirror, bare-chested, and caresses himself. He removes the rest of his clothes as the camera reveals a stack of male bodybuilding magazines on his dresser. He then smashes the mirror in apparent frustration or anger.

Martin sets in motion a plan to leave home, pretend to go to France and then go on to live with Susan. Martin leaves his family and shows up late at Susan's mother's house, where she rents rooms. Presenting himself as Georgie, he gains sympathy both from Susan and her mother and they let him stay.

The plot unravels with Martin's duplicitous nature clashing against his desires to win Susan's heart. He wants her to accept him as a lover, but cannot reveal that he is in fact Martin, as he is worried she will shun him. Meanwhile, Martin uses his new-found identity to his advantage to seek out revenge on his stepfather, who believes he is in France. This series of decisions leads Martin down the path of self-destruction.

One night, Martin sneaks out of Susan's house after stealing a pair of scissors, and stabs his stepfather to death in the garage of his home after his stepfather comes home from a dinner party. The police investigate the next day and focus their attention to finding Martin for questioning.

A few days later, Martin invites himself to tag along with Susan who is going for a swim at a country lake where Martin attempts to kiss her until she refuses his advances, making her uncomfortable and suspicious about him. At home a little later, Susan searches Martin's room while cleaning it, and discovers several books hidden in Martin's drawer that a person with learning difficulties would not read or understand, as well as a book titled Know Yourself from Your Handwriting, in which signatures in the blank pages read 'Martin Durnley'.

At this point, Susan begins investigating Martin, first by talking with his mother, and realizes that Martin and Georgie are one and the same after seeing a photograph of Martin at the house. Next, Susan visits Shashee at a hospital where he works as a resident to question him about split personalities, and suspects that Martin may be not mentally challenged but a narcissistic sociopath.

At Susan's house, Martin begins losing mental control over himself as he rightly suspects that Susan may know who he really is. When Susan's neglected and unsuspecting mother attempts to sexually arouse Martin, he kills her by hacking her apart with a hatchet in the backyard wood shed.

When Susan arrives home, Martin holds her captive in his room after finally revealing his true persona. He forces Susan to undress so he can sexually fondle her, while Susan's mother's body is found in the woodshed by Gerry Henderson, one of the "paying guests", who calls the police just at the time that Shashee learns the truth about Martin and also calls the police from the hospital and races to the house to rescue Susan.

The police arrive at Susan's house where they finally subdue and arrest Martin just when he appears that he is going to kill her. They burst into Susan's room as three shots are heard, but Martin had fired at his reflection in the mirror. As Martin is taken away he claims that he is Georgie and had killed Martin. Susan is unharmed but badly shaken. The final shot shows Martin, now confined in a cell at a local mental hospital, ranting over his lost love Susan.

Cast

Production
In October 1967 John Boulting announced he would be making a film with Hayley Mills and Hywell Bennett who had just done The Family Way with the Boultings. They said a title had not been given to the film.

The film was produced by George W. George and Frank Granat, who had just made Pretty Polly with Hayley Mills. Filming began on 2 January 1968.

The film was a co production between British Lion and a new American company, National General.

Title
The title comes from the poem Slaves by George Sylvester Viereck (1884–1962) which is quoted twice in the movie, once during Professor Fuller's lecture on chromosome damage, and then as an audio flashback when Martin/Georgie is in a cell:
No puppet master pulls the strings on high 
Proportioning our parts, the tinsel and the paint 
A twisted nerve, a ganglion gone awry,
Predestinates the sinner and the saint.

Viereck's motives for his writing have been the subject of some discussion, and have further implications given the debate on eugenics during the middle of the 20th century, a subject somewhat alluded to in Professor Fuller's lecture in the film.

Soundtrack
The film score was composed by Bernard Herrmann and features an eerie whistling tune.

The theme can also be heard in Quentin Tarantino's Kill Bill when a menacing Elle Driver (Daryl Hannah) impersonates a nurse in the hospital scene and in Death Proof as Rosario Dawson's character's ringtone, in several episodes of American Horror Story (2011-2021), in the Malayalam movie Chaappa Kurish as a ringtone of Fahad Fazil's character's iPhone, and in the Bengali movie Chotushkone where it is also used as a ringtone for Parambrata Chatterjee's character's phone. More recently, it has also been used in Honda's 2015 car advertisement.

Stylotone Records reissued the score as part of a deluxe LP set, with a release date of 5 May 2016.

The theme was also sampled in the Rob $tone songs, "Chill Bill" and the Ava Max song “Get Outta My Heart”.

Controversy
The film is notorious for its use of Down syndrome, then referred to as mongolism, as a catalyst for Martin's actions. Letters of complaint were sent to the British censor before the film's release, including one from the National Association for Mental Health. The film's medical adviser, Professor Lionel Penrose, asked for his name to be removed from the film. Roy Boulting said these complaints caused him "shock and surprise and a deep sense of regret and depression". This led to the filmmakers adding a voiceover just prior to the credits which said:
In view of the controversy already aroused, the producers of this film wish to re-emphasise what is already stated in the film, that there is no established scientific connection between mongolism and psychiatric or criminal behaviour.
Even after that had been added, David Ennals, then a Minister of State, Health and Social Security, said: "I do not wish to criticise the film as a film. But I feel it is extremely unfortunate that despite the spoken disclaimer which precedes it, this film can give the impression that there is such a link."

As The New York Times put it, "this is a delicate area indeed", going on to describe the film as "more unsettling than rewarding, and certainly more contrived than compassionate".

Reception

Critical
The Guardian called the film "gross, clumsy and ridiculously predictable." The Observer called it "a glossy commercial psycho thriller which if it weren't for its pernicious implications would be perfectly horrifying" arguing the film would have been better had the character of the elder brother never existed. "Twisted Nerve is a fairly good blood chiller in its genre so long as it is clearly understood that it is a pack of lies." The Los Angeles Times called it "thoroughly engrossing, spine tingling." Filmink called it "not a very good movie in which Mills doesn’t have much to do except react – I think Boulting was trying to fashion her as a Hitchcock blonde but she’s very passive and the movie lacks the directorial flair of a Hitchcock, Seth Holt or Freddie Francis."

References

External links
 
Review of film at Variety
Twisted Nerve at Letterbox DVD

1968 films
1968 horror films
1968 independent films
1960s psychological thriller films
1960s slasher films
British horror films
British independent films
British slasher films
British thriller films
Down syndrome in film
British Lion Films films
1960s English-language films
Films scored by Bernard Herrmann
Films directed by Roy Boulting
Films set in London
Films shot in England
Films shot in Surrey
British serial killer films
1960s British films